Group A of UEFA Women's Euro 2022 was played from 6 to 15 July 2022. The pool was made up of hosts England, Austria, Norway and debutants Northern Ireland.

Teams

Notes

Standings

Matches

England vs Austria

Norway vs Northern Ireland

Austria vs Northern Ireland

England vs Norway

Northern Ireland vs England

Austria vs Norway

Discipline
Fair play points will be used as tiebreakers in the group if the overall and head-to-head records of teams were tied. These are calculated based on yellow and red cards received in all group matches as follows:

 first yellow card: plus 1 point;
 indirect red card (second yellow card): plus 3 points;
 direct red card: plus 4 points;
 yellow card and direct red card: plus 5 points;

References

External links

Group A